Dame Janet Marie Shroff  (born 1944) is a New Zealand public servant who served as the Cabinet Secretary and then as Privacy Commissioner.

Shroff was born in Auckland and educated at Epsom Girls' Grammar School and the University of Auckland. She worked as a research assistant for the Ministry of Foreign Affairs (MFAT) and then as a journalist for the New Zealand Broadcasting Corporation. Her husband also worked for MFAT, and so she worked as a teacher at Samoa College, and then for the UK Cabinet Office during his foreign postings. On her return to New Zealand she worked for the State Services Commission in policy development and then on the creation of State-owned Enterprises.

From 1987 to 2003 she served as Secretary of the Cabinet and Clerk of the Executive Council of New Zealand and during that time she co-led a senior officials group which prepared central government for the introduction of the proportional electoral system in New Zealand. From 2003 to 2014 she served as Privacy Commissioner. In August 2019 she was appointed to chair the New Zealand Electoral Commission.

She is a member of the Media Council and on the boards of Consumer NZ, the Consumer Foundation, and in 2017 Shroff became the inaugural chair of the Privacy Foundation New Zealand, and she continues to sit on its board.

Shroff was awarded the New Zealand Suffrage Centennial Medal in 1993. She was made a Commander of the Royal Victorian Order in 1995 and a Companion of the New Zealand Order of Merit in the 2004 New Years honours list. In the 2022 New Year Honours, Shroff was promoted to Dame Companion of the New Zealand Order of Merit, for services to the State and the community.

References 

Living people
New Zealand public servants
New Zealand Commanders of the Royal Victorian Order
Dames Companion of the New Zealand Order of Merit
University of Auckland alumni
People educated at Epsom Girls' Grammar School
1944 births